Léonard-David Sweezey Tremblay (16 April 1896 – 19 September 1968) was a Liberal party member of the House of Commons of Canada. He was born in Chicoutimi, Quebec and became a journalist and public servant by career.

Tremblay was educated at Lauzon College and served in both World War I and World War II. He was first elected to Parliament at the Dorchester riding in the 1935 general election then re-elected there in 1940, 1945 and 1949. The margin of victory of the 1949 election was particularly small, as Progressive Conservative candidate Gérard Corriveau trailed by 221 votes.

At the end of the 21st Canadian Parliament in June 1953, Tremblay was appointed to the Senate under the Lauzon division and remained in the Senate until September 1965.

References

External links
 

1896 births
1968 deaths
Canadian senators from Quebec
Canadian male journalists
Canadian military personnel of World War I
Canadian military personnel of World War II
Journalists from Quebec
Liberal Party of Canada MPs
Liberal Party of Canada senators
Members of the House of Commons of Canada from Quebec
Politicians from Saguenay, Quebec